Dördlər (also, Dordlar and Dordlyar) is a village in the Gadabay District of Azerbaijan. The village forms part of the municipality of Isaly.

References 

Populated places in Gadabay District